Sidespot barb (Enteromius neefi) is a species of cyprinid fish in the genus Enteromius. It has a disjunct distribution with the northern population in the upper Zambezi, Kafue, and upper Congo River systems in Zambia and Democratic Republic of the Congo, while the southern population is found in the tributaries of the Limpopo River and Steelpoort River. The southern population may be a separate species.

References

sidespot barb
Fish of Zambia
Taxa named by Humphry Greenwood
sidespot barb